Robert Lemaître (7 March 1929 – 9 March 2019) was a former French professional footballer who played as a defender.

Career
Lemaître was born in Plancoët, a commune in the Brittany region. He began his career playing for his hometown club. In 1951, he turned professional and signed with Rennes. Lemaître spent two seasons with the club and, in 1953, signed with Lille. With Lille, he won the league in 1954 and won the Coupe de France the following year. After leaving Lille, Lemaître played for Le Havre, Bordeaux, and Roubaix-Tourcoing before retiring from football altogether in 1960.

Lemaître was also a France international and made his national team debut on 17 December 1953 in an 8–0 victory over Luxembourg. In the match, Lemaître captained the team. He is one of five France internationals in the team's history to captain the national team on his debut.

References

External links
 

1929 births
2019 deaths
Association football defenders
French footballers
France international footballers
Footballers from Brittany
Stade Rennais F.C. players
FC Girondins de Bordeaux players
Lille OSC players
Le Havre AC players
Ligue 1 players
French football managers
CO Roubaix-Tourcoing managers
CO Roubaix-Tourcoing players